This is a list of places in Fiji which have standing links to local communities in other countries known as "town twinning" (usually in Europe) or "sister cities" (usually in the rest of the world).

L
Lautoka
 Jiangmen, China

N
Nadi
 Hangzhou, China

Nailuva
 Des Plaines, United States

Nasinu
 Shefa Province, Vanuatu

S
Suva

 Beihai, China
 Brighton, Australia
 Guangdong, China
 Port Moresby, Papua New Guinea
 Shaoxing, China
 Yongsan (Seoul), South Korea

References

Fiji
Foreign relations of Fiji
Fiji geography-related lists
Populated places in Fiji